Grayson is a town in Okmulgee County, Oklahoma, United States. The population was 159 at the 2010 census, an increase of 18.7 percent from the figure of 134 recorded in 2000.

History
Grayson was originally named Wildcat and was located within the area that became McIntosh County at statehood. It was named for a Muscogee chief, George W. Grayson. The name changed when Grayson's post office was established February 10, 1902, although the legal town name remained as Wildcat into the 1960s. At statehood, the town had 375 residents. It grew slightly to 411 in 1910, then began to decline.

The Encyclopedia of Oklahoma History and Culture indicates it was an “All-Black Town,” one of more than fifty identifiable towns and settlements created by African-Americans within the borders of the current State of Oklahoma from 1865 to 1920.

In 1918, the border between McIntosh and Okmulgee counties was realigned, which brought Grayson into Okmulgee County.

Geography
Grayson is located at  (35.505738, -95.872362).

Demographics

As of the census of 2000, there were 134 people, 55 households, and 32 families residing in the town. There were 57 housing units at an average density of 51.0 per square mile (19.6/km2). The racial makeup of the town was 9.70% White, 61.94% African American, 5.22% Native American, 2.24% from other races, and 20.90% from two or more races. Hispanic or Latino of any race were 2.24% of the population.

There were 55 households, out of which 23.6% had children under the age of 18 living with them, 41.8% were married couples living together, 12.7% had a female householder with no husband present, and 41.8% were non-families. 36.4% of all households were made up of individuals, and 9.1% had someone living alone who was 65 years of age or older. The average household size was 2.44 and the average family size was 3.25.

In the town, the population was spread out, with 28.4% under the age of 18, 4.5% from 18 to 24, 24.6% from 25 to 44, 20.9% from 45 to 64, and 21.6% who were 65 years of age or older. The median age was 40 years. For every 100 females, there were 100.0 males. For every 100 females age 18 and over, there were 104.3 males.

The median income for a household in the town was $20,208, and the median income for a family was $24,375. Males had a median income of $20,250 versus $19,375 for females. The per capita income for the town was $7,688. There were 13.2% of families and 22.3% of the population living below the poverty line, including 9.5% of under eighteens and 43.3% of those over 64.

See also
 Boley, Brooksville, Clearview, Langston, Lima, Redbird, Rentiesville, Summit, Taft, Tatums, Tullahassee, and Vernon, other "All-Black" settlements that were part of the Land Run of 1889.

References

External links
 All-Black Towns in Oklahoma
 Encyclopedia of Oklahoma History and Culture - Grayson

Towns in Okmulgee County, Oklahoma
Towns in Oklahoma
Populated places in Oklahoma established by African Americans
Pre-statehood history of Oklahoma